Chunlan Group Corp is a Chinese corporation with its headquarters at Taizhou, Jiangsu province.

The founder, Tao Jianxing, took over the management of Taizhou Cooling Equipment Factory in 1985, which gradually expanded in the air conditioner market. The current Chunlan Group Corp was founded in 1993, and has been the leading manufacturer of air conditioners in China.

The company currently has expanded into three business areas: electrical appliances, automobiles and new energies.

The name of the corporation is from the noble orchid (Cymbidium goeringii)

External links
 Corporate website (English)

Manufacturing companies established in 1985
Chinese brands
Companies based in Jiangsu
Government-owned companies of China
Heating, ventilation, and air conditioning companies
Chinese companies established in 1985